Wegmann is a German surname. Notable people with the surname include:

 Alain Wegmann, Swiss professor of systemic modeling
 Alice Wegmann (born 1995), Brazilian actress
 Christian Wegmann (born 1976), German cyclist
 Fabian Wegmann, German road racing cyclist 
 Günther Wegmann, German Luftwaffe fighter ace during World War II 
 Jürgen Wegmann, German football player 
 Uwe Wegmann, German football coach and a retired player
 Karl W. Wegmann, American professor of geology

See also
 Krauss-Maffei Wegmann, a German defence company 
 Henschel-Wegmann Train, a passenger express train operated by the Deutsche Reichsbahn in Germany
 Wegman

German-language surnames